Eleanor Mary Plumer (22 July 1885 – 29 June 1967) was a British academic administrator. She was the eldest daughter of Field Marshal Herbert Plumer.

Career 
After studying English at King's College London, she worked there as a lecturer and tutor to women students.

In 1924 she became Warden of the Mary Ward Settlement and from 1927 to 1931 of St Andrew's Hall, University of Reading.

She was appointed Principal of the Society of Oxford Home-Students in 1940 and oversaw it's change to become St Anne's Society in 1942 and then St Anne's College in 1952. She retired in 1953.

References 

1885 births
1967 deaths
Alumni of King's College London
Principals of St Anne's College, Oxford